The Barusan cuckoo-dove (Macropygia modiglianii) is a species of bird in the family Columbidae. It is found on three of the western Sumatran islands.

The Barusan cuckoo-dove was formerly considered as a subspecies of the ruddy cuckoo-dove. It was promoted to species status based on the results of an acoustic study published in 2016.
 
Three subspecies are recognised, each endemic to a specific island:
 M. m. modiglianii Salvadori, 1887 – Nias Island
 M. m. elassa Oberholser, 1912 – Mentawai Islands
 M. m. hypopercna Oberholser, 1912 – Simeulue Island

References 

Macropygia
Birds described in 1887